Anadelosemia senesciella is a species of snout moth. It is found in Costa Rica.

The wingspan is about 15 mm. The forewings are ashy white, although the basal area to the antemedial line are stained with pale brown. The hindwings are semihyaline tinted with brown.

References

Phycitinae
Moths of Central America
Moths described in 1913